Crimea has participated in the Turkvision Song Contest twice since its debut in .  The Crimean broadcaster, Crimea Public Radio and Television (CPRT), has been the organiser for the Crimean entry since its debut in the contest. In 2013, Crimea's first entry at Turkvision, Elvira Sarihalil, failed to qualify for the grand final.

History

2010s
Crimea made their debut in the Turkvision Song Contest at the 2013 festival, in Eskişehir, Turkey. Originally it was announced that Fazile Ibraimova would be representing Crimea in the contest, however it was later clarified that she was representing Ukraine. Crimea made a public call for songs on 29 October 2013 with auditions taking place on 6 and 7 November 2013, and the final taking place on 18 November 2013. It was announced after the audition process that final had moved from 17 November to 23 November 2013 due to higher interest, a total of 13 singers would take part in the selection. The 13 finalists were announced on 21 November 2013. Elvira Sarykhalil was selected by a jury to representing Crimea in Turkey, in the semi final she sang "Dağların Elları" but failed to qualify for the final.

On 20 July 2014 it was announced that Crimea would make their second appearance at the Turkvision Song Contest 2014 to be held in Kazan, Tatarstan in November 2014. Crimea held an eight artist selection in November 2014, the Crimean representative was the winner of the Crimean TV series "Shellyale". Darina sang "Gider Isen" at the competition in Kazan, she performed twentieth in the semi final and finished eighth with 178 points bringing Crimea into their first final. In the final she performed second, Crimea finished sixth with a total of 186 points.

Participation overview

References 

Turkvision
Countries in the Turkvision Song Contest